Child of the Danube (German: Kind der Donau) is a 1950 Austrian musical film directed by Georg Jacoby and starring Marika Rökk, Fred Liewehr and Harry Fuß. It was one of a cycle of popular musicals made by Jacoby and Rökk.

The film was shot using Agfacolor at the Soviet-controlled Rosenhügel Studios in Vienna. Location shooting took place around Linz on the River Danube. The film's sets were designed by the art director Julius von Borsody.

Partial cast
Marika Rökk as Marika 
Fred Liewehr as Georg 
Harry Fuß as Heinrich 
Fritz Muliar as Oskar 
Joseph Egger as Christoph 
Annie Rosar as Frau Kovacs 
Helli Servi as Edith 
Nadja Tiller as actress
Erich Auer as tenor
Karl Skraup as editor

References

Bibliography
Bergfelder, Tim & Bock, Hans-Michael. ''The Concise Cinegraph: Encyclopedia of German. Berghahn Books, 2009.

External links

Austrian musical films
1950s German-language films
Films directed by Georg Jacoby
Films shot at Rosenhügel Studios
1950 musical films
Films scored by Nico Dostal